N100 may refer to:
 N100, a type of evoked potential in the brain
 N100 Plan, the corporate code name for the top secret concept, engineering and development of an entirely new motorcycle engine by Kawasaki Motorcycle Corporation
 N100 (mobile phone), the first mobile phone to have an integrated 10 megapixel CMOS sensor, TV tuner and a camcorder
 Pocket LOOX N100, a navigation system